Kjartan Atli Kjartansson (born 23 May 1984) is an Icelandic sports TV and radio show host. He hosts Stöð 2 Sport's Domino's Körfuboltakvöld (English: Domino's Basketball Night) and was the host of the morning radio show Brennslan on FM957 from 2014 to 2020. He played basketball for several season in the Úrvalsdeild karla and won the Icelandic Basketball Cup three times as a member of Stjarnan, in 2009 and 2013 as a player and in 2015 as an assistant coach.

Early life
Kjartan was born in Reykjavík and grew up in Hafnarfjörður and later Álftanes.

Basketball

Playing career
Kjartan played for nine seasons in the Icelandic top-tier Úrvalsdeild karla, mostly with Stjarnan. He was one of the key players in Stjarnan's resurgence to the basketball scene, helping the club win the Icelandic Basketball Cup in 2009 and 2013, and the Super Cup in 2009. He retired from top-level play in January 2014. On April 8, 2018, he hit a go-ahead three-pointer in the waning seconds of Álftanes game against Stál-úlfur in the Division III semi-finals, helping them to victory and promotion to Division II. On 16 April 2019, he won the Division II championship after Álftanes defeated ÍA in the league finals, 123–100, and achieved promotion to Division I.

In November 2021, Kjartan was called up to Álftanes main squad from the reserve team due to several players missing the game due to COVID-19 protocols. In the 114-91 win, he had 6 points and 5 assists.

Coaching career
In 2012, Kjartan was hired as head coach for Stjarnan women's team. He led them to a 12–4 record in the Division I, the second best record in the league. In the playoffs they lost Hamar for a seat in the Úrvalsdeild kvenna. Kjartan served as an assistant coach with Stjarnan men's team during the 2014–2015 season, helping it win the Icelandic Basketball Cup in 2015.

In May 2022, Kjartan was hired as the head coach of Álftanes.

National team career
Kjartan played 12 games for the Icelandic national U-18 basketball team.

Music career
Kjartan was a member of the Bæjarins bestu hip hop group in the 2000s and performed under the name Kájoð.

References

External links
Profile at realgm.com
Profile at kki.is

1984 births
Living people
Álftanes men's basketball players
Breiðablik men's basketball players
Hamar men's basketball players
Haukar men's basketball players
Kjartan Kjartansson
Kjartan Kjartansson
Kjartan Kjartansson
Small forwards
Stjarnan men's basketball coaches
Stjarnan men's basketball players
Stjarnan women's basketball coaches
Kjartan Kjartansson